Oskar Olausson (born 10 November 2002) is a Swedish professional ice hockey winger currently playing with the Colorado Eagles in the American Hockey League (AHL) as a prospect under contract to the Colorado Avalanche of the National Hockey League (NHL). Olausson was drafted in the first round, 28th overall, by the Avalanche in the 2021 NHL Entry Draft.

Playing career
Olausson played as a youth with Tranås AIF before moving to continue his junior development with HV71. Entering his third season in the J20 Nationell, Olausson began the 2020–21 campaign at J20 level, he collected 14 goals and 27 points in 16 games before joining the senior team. He made his professional debut with HV71 in the Swedish Hockey League (SHL), recording 3 goals and 4 points in 16 regular season games before concluding the season on loan in the HockeyAllsvenskan with second tier club, Södertälje SK contributing with 6 points in 11 outings.

After his selection to the Avalanche in the first round, 28th overall, in the 2021 NHL Entry Draft, Olausson was originally slated to return to newly relegated HV71 of the Allsvenskan. However, on 7 August 2021, Olausson was signed by the Avalanche to a three-year, entry-level contract in order to continue his development in North America. With his previous selection of his junior rights in the CHL Import Draft going to the Barrie Colts, 118th overall, Olausson agreed to terms with the club, giving a commitment on 20 August 2021.

In the 2021–22 season, Olausson quickly adapted to the North American size rink, scoring 12 goals and 25 points through 22 games with the Colts. While leading the club in goals, Olausson was traded by the Colts to fellow divisional club the Oshawa Generals, in exchange for Kevin Niedenz and multiple draft selections on 6 January 2022. Olausson continued in a top-line scoring role, adding 14 goals and 24 points through 33 regular season games with the Generals. Following a first-round exit in the post-season, Olausson was re-assigned by the Avalanche to join primary affiliate, the Colorado Eagles of the AHL, for the playoffs on 2 May 2022. Olausson made four appearances with the Eagles through the post-season, finishing with 2 assists.

Following training camp and pre-season in preparation for the  season, Olausson was re-assigned to continue his development with the Colorado Eagles in the AHL. He notched his first professional goal in North America, collecting the game-winning goal in a 6–2 win over the Calgary Wranglers on 21 October 2022. After posting 8 points through 16 games for the Eagles and with the Avalanche dealing with a glut of injuries, Olausson received his first NHL recall on 23 November 2022. Initially placed on the Avalanche's second-line, Olausson made his NHL debut that night at Ball Arena in a 4–3 defeat to the Vancouver Canucks. Following the game, Olausson was re-assigned to the AHL to continue his tenure with the Eagles.

Career statistics

Regular season and playoffs

International

References

External links
 

2002 births
Living people
Barrie Colts players
Colorado Avalanche draft picks
Colorado Avalanche players
Colorado Eagles players
HV71 players
Ice hockey people from Stockholm
National Hockey League first-round draft picks
Oshawa Generals players
Södertälje SK players
Swedish ice hockey forwards